Vijay Manikrao Bhambale is an Indian politician and ex-member of the Maharashtra Legislative Assembly.

Constituency
Bhambale represents the Jintur (Vidhan Sabha constituency) of Maharashtra.

Political party
Bhambale is from the Nationalist Congress Party. Also he is district president of NCP from 2009 to 2016

External links
GENERAL ELECTION, 2014 LEGISLATIVE ASSEMBLY MAHARASHTRA

References

Living people
Maharashtra MLAs 2014–2019
Marathi politicians
Nationalist Congress Party politicians from Maharashtra
Year of birth missing (living people)